This list of birds of Wyoming includes species documented in the U.S. state of Wyoming by the Wyoming Game and Fish Department (WGFD) as of May 2021 with some additions from Avibase. The list contains 452 species. Of them, 118 are classed as accidental, and seven species have been introduced to North America.

This list is presented in the taxonomic sequence of the Check-list of North and Middle American Birds, 7th edition through the 62nd Supplement, published by the American Ornithological Society (AOS). Common and scientific names are also those of the Check-list, except that the common names of families are from the Clements taxonomy because the AOS list does not include them.

Unless otherwise noted, all species listed below are considered to occur regularly in Wyoming as permanent residents, summer or winter visitors, or migrants. These tags are used to annotate some species:

 (A) Accidental - "species with accidental, unpredictable, occurrence" per WGFD
 (I) Introduced - a species established in North America as a result of human action

Ducks, geese, and waterfowl

Order: AnseriformesFamily: Anatidae

The family Anatidae includes the ducks and most duck-like waterfowl, such as geese and swans. These birds are adapted to an aquatic existence with webbed feet, bills which are flattened to a greater or lesser extent, and feathers that are excellent at shedding water due to special oils. Forty-one species have been recorded in Wyoming.

Snow goose, Anser caerulescens
Ross's goose, Anser rossii
Greater white-fronted goose, Anser albifrons
Brant, Branta bernicla (A) 
Cackling goose, Branta hutchinsii (A)
Canada goose, Branta canadensis
Trumpeter swan, Cygnus buccinator
Tundra swan, Cygnus columbianus
Whooper swan, Cygnus cygnus (A)
Wood duck, Aix sponsa
Garganey, Spatula querquedula (A)
Blue-winged teal, Spatula discors
Cinnamon teal, Spatula cyanoptera
Northern shoveler, Spatula clypeata
Gadwall, Mareca strepera
Eurasian wigeon, Mareca penelope (A)
American wigeon, Mareca americana
Mallard, Anas platyrhynchos
Mexican duck, Anas diazi (A)
American black duck, Anas rubripes (A)
Mottled duck, Anas fulvigula (A)
Northern pintail, Anas acuta
Green-winged teal, Anas crecca
Canvasback, Aythya valisineria
Redhead, Aythya americana
Ring-necked duck, Aythya collaris
Tufted duck, Aythya fuligula (A)
Greater scaup, Aythya marila
Lesser scaup, Aythya affinis
Harlequin duck, Histrionicus histrionicus
Surf scoter, Melanitta perspicillata
White-winged scoter, Melanitta deglandi
Black scoter, Melanitta americana (A)
Long-tailed duck, Clangula hyemalis
Bufflehead, Bucephala albeola
Common goldeneye, Bucephala clangula
Barrow's goldeneye, Bucephala islandica
Hooded merganser, Lophodytes cucullatus
Common merganser, Mergus merganser
Red-breasted merganser, Mergus serrator
Ruddy duck, Oxyura jamaicensis

New World quail
Order: GalliformesFamily: Odontophoridae

The New World quails are small, plump terrestrial birds only distantly related to the quails of the Old World, but named for their similar appearance and habits. One species has been recorded in Wyoming.

Northern bobwhite, Colinus virginianus
California quail, Callipepla californica (A)

Pheasants, grouse, and allies

Order: GalliformesFamily: Phasianidae

Phasianidae consists of the pheasants and their allies. These are terrestrial species, variable in size but generally plump with broad relatively short wings. Many species are gamebirds or have been domesticated as a food source for humans. Ten species have been recorded in Wyoming.

Wild turkey, Meleagris gallopavo
Ruffed grouse, Bonasa umbellus
Greater sage-grouse, Centrocercus urophasianus
White-tailed ptarmigan, Lagopus leucurus
Dusky grouse, Dendragapus obscurus
Sharp-tailed grouse, Tympanuchus phasianellus
Greater prairie-chicken, Tympanuchus cupido (A)
Gray partridge, Perdix perdix (I)
Ring-necked pheasant, Phasianus colchicus (I)
Chukar, Alectoris chukar (I)

Grebes

Order: PodicipediformesFamily: Podicipedidae

Grebes are small to medium-large freshwater diving birds. They have lobed toes and are excellent swimmers and divers. However, they have their feet placed far back on the body, making them quite ungainly on land. Six species have been recorded in Wyoming.

Pied-billed grebe, Podilymbus podiceps
Horned grebe, Podiceps auritus
Red-necked grebe, Podiceps grisegena (A)
Eared grebe, Podiceps nigricollis
Western grebe, Aechmorphorus occidentalis
Clark's grebe, Aechmorphorus clarkii

Pigeons and doves

Order: ColumbiformesFamily: Columbidae

Pigeons and doves are stout-bodied birds with short necks and short slender bills with a fleshy cere. Five species have been recorded in Wyoming.

Rock pigeon, Columba livia (I)
Band-tailed pigeon, Patagioenas fasciata
Eurasian collared-dove, Streptopelia decaocto (I)
White-winged dove, Zenaida asiatica (A)
Mourning dove, Zenaida macroura

Cuckoos
Order: CuculiformesFamily: Cuculidae

The family Cuculidae includes cuckoos, roadrunners, and anis. These birds are of variable size with slender bodies, long tails, and strong legs. Two species have been recorded in Wyoming.

Yellow-billed cuckoo, Coccyzus americanus
Black-billed cuckoo, Coccyzus erythropthalmus

Nightjars and allies
Order: CaprimulgiformesFamily: Caprimulgidae

Nightjars are medium-sized nocturnal birds that usually nest on the ground. They have long wings, short legs, and very short bills. Most have small feet, of little use for walking, and long pointed wings. Their soft plumage is cryptically colored to resemble bark or leaves. Three species have been recorded in Wyoming.

Lesser nighthawk,  Chordeiles acutipennis (A)
Common nighthawk,  Chordeiles minor
Common poorwill,  Phalaenoptilus nuttallii

Swifts
Order: ApodiformesFamily: Apodidae

The swifts are small birds which spend the majority of their lives flying. These birds have very short legs and never settle voluntarily on the ground, perching instead only on vertical surfaces. Many swifts have very long, swept-back wings which resemble a crescent or boomerang. Four species have been recorded in Wyoming.

Black swift, Cypseloides niger
Chimney swift, Chaetura pelagica
Vaux's swift, Chaetura vauxi (A)
White-throated swift, Aeronautes saxatalis

Hummingbirds
Order: ApodiformesFamily: Trochilidae

Hummingbirds are small birds capable of hovering in mid-air due to the rapid flapping of their wings. They are the only birds that can fly backwards. Seven species have been recorded in Wyoming.

Rivoli's hummingbird, Eugenes fulgens (A)
Ruby-throated hummingbird, Archilochus colubris (A)
Black-chinned hummingbird, Archilochus alexandri
Anna's hummingbird, Calypte anna (A)
Calliope hummingbird, Selasphorus calliope
Rufous hummingbird, Selasphorus rufus
Broad-tailed hummingbird, Selasphorus platycercus

Rails, gallinules, and coots

Order: GruiformesFamily: Rallidae

Rallidae is a large family of small to medium-sized birds which includes the rails, crakes, coots, and gallinules. The most typical family members occupy dense vegetation in damp environments near lakes, swamps, or rivers. In general they are shy and secretive birds, making them difficult to observe. Most species have strong legs and long toes which are well adapted to soft uneven surfaces. They tend to have short, rounded wings and tend to be weak fliers. Seven species have been recorded in Wyoming.

Virginia rail, Rallus limicola
Sora, Porzana carolina
Common gallinule, Gallinula galeata (A)
American coot, Fulica americana
Purple gallinule, Porphyrio martinicus (A)
Yellow rail, Coturnicops noveboracensis (A)
Black rail, Laterallus jamaicensis (A)

Cranes
Order: GruiformesFamily: Gruidae

Cranes are large, long-legged, and long-necked birds. Unlike the similar-looking but unrelated herons, cranes fly with necks outstretched, not pulled back. Most have elaborate and noisy courting displays or "dances". Two species have been recorded in Wyoming.

Sandhill crane, Antigone canadensis
Whooping crane, Grus americana

Stilts and avocets

Order: CharadriiformesFamily: Recurvirostridae

Recurvirostridae is a family of large wading birds which includes the avocets and stilts. The avocets have long legs and long up-curved bills. The stilts have extremely long legs and long, thin, straight bills. Two species have been recorded in Wyoming.

Black-necked stilt, Himantopus mexicanus
American avocet, Recurvirostra americana

Plovers and lapwings

Order: CharadriiformesFamily: Charadriidae

The family Charadriidae includes the plovers, dotterels, and lapwings. They are small to medium-sized birds with compact bodies, short thick necks, and long, usually pointed, wings. They are found in open country worldwide, mostly in habitats near water. Seven species have been recorded in Wyoming.

Black-bellied plover, Pluvialis squatarola
American golden-plover, Pluvialis dominica
Killdeer, Charadrius vociferus
Semipalmated plover, Charadrius semipalmatus
Piping plover, Charadrius melodus
Snowy plover, Charadrius nivosus
Mountain plover, Charadrius montanus

Sandpipers and allies
Order: CharadriiformesFamily: Scolopacidae

Scolopacidae is a large diverse family of small to medium-sized shorebirds including the sandpipers, curlews, godwits, shanks, tattlers, woodcocks, snipes, dowitchers, and phalaropes. The majority of these species eat small invertebrates picked out of the mud or soil. Different lengths of legs and bills enable multiple species to feed in the same habitat, particularly on the coast, without direct competition for food. Twenty-nine species have been recorded in Wyoming.

Upland sandpiper, Bartramia longicauda
Whimbrel, Numenius phaeopus
Long-billed curlew, Numenius americanus
Hudsonian godwit, Limosa haemastica
Marbled godwit, Limosa fedoa
Ruddy turnstone, Arenaria interpres
Red knot, Calidris canutus
Stilt sandpiper, Calidris himantopus
Sanderling, Calidris alba
Dunlin, Calidris alpina
Baird's sandpiper, Calidris bairdii
Least sandpiper, Calidris minutilla
White-rumped sandpiper, Calidris fuscicollis 
Buff-breasted sandpiper, Calidris subruficollis
Pectoral sandpiper, Calidris melanotos
Semipalmated sandpiper, Calidris pusilla
Western sandpiper, Calidris mauri
Short-billed dowitcher, Limnodromus griseus
Long-billed dowitcher, Limnodromus scolopaceus
American woodcock, Scolopax minor (A)
Wilson's snipe, Gallinago delicata
Spotted sandpiper, Actitis macularius
Solitary sandpiper, Tringa solitaria
Lesser yellowlegs, Tringa flavipes
Willet, Tringa semipalmata
Greater yellowlegs, Tringa melanoleuca
Wilson's phalarope, Phalaropus tricolor
Red-necked phalarope, Phalaropus lobatus
Red phalarope, Phalaropus fulicarius (A)

Skuas and jaegers
Order: CharadriiformesFamily: Stercorariidae

Skuas and jaegers are in general medium to large birds, typically with gray or brown plumage, often with white markings on the wings. They have longish bills with hooked tips and webbed feet with sharp claws. They look like large dark gulls, but have a fleshy cere above the upper mandible. They are strong, acrobatic fliers. Three species have been recorded in Wyoming.

Pomarine jaeger, Stercorarius pomarinus (A)
Parasitic jaeger, Stercorarius parasiticus (A)
Long-tailed jaeger, Stercorarius longicaudus (A)

Auks, murres, and puffins
Order: CharadriiformesFamily: Alcidae

The family Alcidae includes auks, murres, and puffins. These are short-winged birds that live on the open sea and normally only come ashore for breeding. Two species have been recorded in Wyoming.

Long-billed murrelet, Brachyramphus perdix (A)
Ancient murrelet, Synthliboarmphus antiquus (A)

Gulls, terns, and skimmers

Order: CharadriiformesFamily: Laridae

Laridae is a family of medium to large seabirds and includes gulls, terns, kittiwakes, and skimmers. They are typically gray or white, often with black markings on the head or wings. They have stout, longish bills and webbed feet. Twenty-two species have been recorded in Wyoming.

Black-legged kittiwake, Rissa tridactyla (A)
Sabine's gull, Xema sabini
Bonaparte's gull, Chroicocephalus philadelphia
Black-headed gull, Chroicocephalus ridibundus (A)
Little gull, Hydrocoloeus minutus (A)
Ross's gull, Rhodostethia rosea (A)
Laughing gull, Leucophaeus atricilla (A)
Franklin's gull, Leucophaeus pipixcan
Heermann's gull, Larus heermanni (A)
Short-billed gull, Larus brachyrhynchus (A)
Ring-billed gull, Larus delawarensis
California gull, Larus californicus
Herring gull, Larus argentatus
Iceland gull, Larus glaucoides (A)
Lesser black-backed gull, Larus fuscus (A)
Glaucous-winged gull, Larus glaucescens (A)
Glaucous gull, Larus hyperboreus (A)
Great black-backed gull, Larus marinus (A)
Least tern, Sternula antillarum (A)
Caspian tern, Hydroprogne caspia
Black tern, Chlidonias niger
Common tern, Sterna hirundo
Arctic tern, Sterna paradisaea (A)
Forster's tern, Sterna forsteri

Loons
Order: GaviiformesFamily: Gaviidae

Loons are aquatic birds the size of a large duck, to which they are unrelated. Their plumage is largely gray or black, and they have spear-shaped bills. Loons swim well and fly adequately, but are almost hopeless on land, because their legs are placed towards the rear of the body. Four species have been recorded in Wyoming.

Red-throated loon, Gavia stellata
Pacific loon, Gavia pacifica
Common loon, Gavia immer
Yellow-billed loon, Gavia adamsii (A)

Shearwaters and petrels
Order: ProcellariiformesFamily: Procellariidae

The procellariids are the main group of medium-sized "true petrels", characterized by united nostrils with medium septum and a long outer functional primary.

Streaked shearwater, Calonectris leucomelas (A)

Storks
Order: CiconiiformesFamily: Ciconiidae

Storks are large, heavy, long-legged, long-necked wading birds with long stout bills and wide wingspans. They lack the powder down that other wading birds such as herons, spoonbills, and ibises use to clean off fish slime. Storks lack a pharynx and are mute. One species has been recorded in Wyoming.

Wood stork, Mycteria americana (A)

Frigatebirds
Order: SuliformesFamily: Fregatidae

Frigatebirds are large seabirds usually found over tropical oceans. They are large, black, or black-and-white, with long wings and deeply forked tails. The males have colored inflatable throat pouches. They do not swim or walk and cannot take off from a flat surface. Having the largest wingspan-to-body-weight ratio of any bird, they are essentially aerial, able to stay aloft for more than a week. One species has been recorded in Wyoming.

Lesser frigatebird, Fregata ariel (A)

Cormorants and shags
Order: SuliformesFamily: Phalacrocoracidae

Cormorants are medium-to-large aquatic birds, usually with mainly dark plumage and areas of colored skin on the face. The bill is long, thin, and sharply hooked. Their feet are four-toed and webbed. One species has been recorded in Wyoming.

Double-crested cormorant, Nannopterum auritum
Neotropic cormorant, Nannopterum brasilianum (A)

Pelicans

Order: PelecaniformesFamily: Pelecanidae

Pelicans are very large water birds with a distinctive pouch under their beak. Like other birds in the order Pelecaniformes, they have four webbed toes. Two species have been recorded in Wyoming.

American white pelican, Pelecanus erythrorhynchos
Brown pelican, Pelecanus occidentalis (A)

Herons, egrets, and bitterns

Order: PelecaniformesFamily: Ardeidae

The family Ardeidae contains the herons, egrets, and bitterns. Herons and egrets are medium to large wading birds with long necks and legs. Bitterns tend to be shorter necked and more secretive. Members of Ardeidae fly with their necks retracted, unlike other long-necked birds such as storks, ibises, and spoonbills. Eleven species have been recorded in Wyoming.

American bittern, Botaurus lentiginosus
Least bittern, Ixobrychus exilis (A)
Great blue heron, Ardea herodias
Great egret, Ardea alba (A)
Snowy egret, Egretta thula
Little blue heron, Egretta caerulea (A)
Tricolored heron, Egretta tricolor (A)
Cattle egret, Bubulcus ibis
Green heron, Butorides virescens
Black-crowned night-heron Nycticorax nycticorax
Yellow-crowned night-heron, Nyctanassa violacea (A)

Ibises and spoonbills
Order: PelecaniformesFamily: Threskiornithidae

The family Threskiornithidae includes the ibises and spoonbills. They have long, broad wings. Their bodies tend to be elongated, the neck more so, with rather long legs. The bill is also long, decurved in the case of the ibises, straight and distinctively flattened in the spoonbills. Three species have been recorded in Wyoming.

White ibis, Eudocimus albus (A)
Glossy ibis, Plegadis falcinellus (A)
White-faced ibis, Plegadis chihi

New World vultures

Order: CathartiformesFamily: Cathartidae

The New World vultures are not closely related to Old World vultures, but superficially resemble them because of convergent evolution. Like the Old World vultures, they are scavengers, however, unlike Old World vultures, which find carcasses by sight, New World vultures have a good sense of smell with which they locate carcasses. Three species have been recorded in Wyoming.

California condor, Gymnogyps californianus (A)
Black vulture, Coragyps atratus (A)
Turkey vulture, Cathartes aura

Osprey
Order: AccipitriformesFamily: Pandionidae

Pandionidae is a family of fish-eating birds of prey possessing a very large, powerful hooked beak for tearing flesh from their prey, strong legs, powerful talons, and keen eyesight. The family is monotypic.

Osprey, Pandion haliaetus

Hawks, eagles, and kites

Order: AccipitriformesFamily: Accipitridae

Accipitridae is a family of birds of prey which includes hawks, eagles, kites, harriers, and Old World vultures. These birds have very large powerful hooked beaks for tearing flesh from their prey, strong legs, powerful talons, and keen eyesight. Sixteen species have been recorded in Wyoming.

White-tailed kite, Elanus leucurus (A)
Swallow-tailed kite, Elanoides forficatus (A)
Golden eagle, Aquila chrysaetos
Northern harrier, Circus hudsonius
Sharp-shinned hawk, Accipiter striatus
Cooper's hawk, Accipiter cooperii
Northern goshawk, Accipiter gentilis
Bald eagle, Haliaeetus leucocephalus
Mississippi kite, Ictinia mississippiensis (A)
Harris's hawk, Parabuteo unicinctus (A)
Red-shouldered hawk, Buteo lineatus (A)
Broad-winged hawk, Buteo platypterus
Swainson's hawk, Buteo swainsoni
Red-tailed hawk, Buteo jamaicensis
Rough-legged hawk, Buteo lagopus
Ferruginous hawk, Buteo regalis

Barn-owls
Order: StrigiformesFamily: Tytonidae

Barn-owls are medium to large owls with large heads and characteristic heart-shaped faces. They have long strong legs with powerful talons. One species has been recorded in Wyoming.

Barn owl, Tyto alba

Owls

Order: StrigiformesFamily: Strigidae

Typical owls are small to large solitary nocturnal birds of prey. They have large forward-facing eyes and ears, a hawk-like beak, and a conspicuous circle of feathers around each eye called a facial disk. Fourteen species have been recorded in Wyoming.

Flammulated owl, Psiloscops flammeolus
Western screech-owl, Megascops kennicottii
Eastern screech-owl, Megascops asio
Great horned owl, Bubo virginianus
Snowy owl, Bubo scandiacus
Northern hawk owl, Surnia ulula (A)
Northern pygmy-owl, Glaucidium gnoma
Burrowing owl, Athene cunicularia
Barred owl, Strix varia (A)
Great gray owl, Strix nebulosa
Long-eared owl, Asio otus
Short-eared owl, Asio flammeus
Boreal owl, Aegolius funereus
Northern saw-whet owl, Aegolius acadicus

Kingfishers
Order: CoraciiformesFamily: Alcedinidae

Kingfishers are medium-sized birds with large heads, long pointed bills, short legs, and stubby tails. One species has been recorded in Wyoming.

Belted kingfisher, Megaceryle alcyon

Woodpeckers
Order: PiciformesFamily: Picidae

Woodpeckers are small to medium-sized birds with chisel-like beaks, short legs, stiff tails, and long tongues used for capturing insects. Some species have feet with two toes pointing forward and two backward, while several species have only three toes. Many woodpeckers have the habit of tapping noisily on tree trunks with their beaks. Fourteen species have been recorded in Wyoming.

Lewis's woodpecker, Melanerpes lewis
Red-headed woodpecker, Melanerpes erythrocephalus
Acorn woodpecker, Melanerpes formicivorus (A)
Red-bellied woodpecker, Melanerpes carolinus (A)
Williamson's sapsucker, Sphyrapicus thyroideus
Yellow-bellied sapsucker, Sphyrapicus varius (A)
Red-naped sapsucker, Sphyrapicus nuchalis
American three-toed woodpecker, Picoides dorsalis
Black-backed woodpecker, Picoides arcticus
Downy woodpecker, Dryobates pubescens
Hairy woodpecker, Dryobates villosus
White-headed woodpecker, Dryobates albolarvatus (A)
Northern flicker, Colaptes auratus
Pileated woodpecker, Dryocopus pileatus (A)

Falcons and caracaras

Order: FalconiformesFamily: Falconidae

Falconidae is a family of diurnal birds of prey, notably the falcons and caracaras. They differ from hawks, eagles, and kites in that they kill with their beaks instead of their talons. Six species have been recorded in Wyoming.

Crested caracara, Caracara plancus (A)
American kestrel, Falco sparverius
Merlin, Falco columbarius
Gyrfalcon, Falco rusticolus (A)
Peregrine falcon, Falco peregrinus
Prairie falcon, Falco mexicanus

Tyrant flycatchers
Order: PasseriformesFamily: Tyrannidae

Tyrant flycatchers are Passerine birds which occur throughout North and South America. They superficially resemble the Old World flycatchers, but are more robust and have stronger bills. They do not have the sophisticated vocal capabilities of the songbirds. Most, but not all, are rather plain. As the name implies, most are insectivorous. Twenty-one species have been recorded in Wyoming.

Ash-throated flycatcher, Myiarchus cinerascens
Great crested flycatcher, Myiarchus crinitus (A)
Cassin's kingbird, Tyrannus vociferans
Western kingbird, Tyrannus verticalis
Eastern kingbird, Tyrannus tyrannus
Scissor-tailed flycatcher, Tyrannus forficatus (A)
Fork-tailed flycatcher, Tyrannus savana (A)
Olive-sided flycatcher, Contopus cooperi
Western wood-pewee, Contopus sordidulus
Eastern wood-pewee, Contopus virens (A)
Alder flycatcher, Empidonax alnorum (A)
Willow flycatcher, Empidonax traillii
Least flycatcher, Empidonax minimus
Hammond's flycatcher, Empidonax hammondii
Gray flycatcher, Empidonax wrightii
Dusky flycatcher, Empidonax oberholseri
Cordilleran flycatcher, Empidonax occidentalis
Black phoebe, Sayornis nigricans (A)
Eastern phoebe, Sayornis phoebe
Say's phoebe, Sayornis saya
Vermilion flycatcher, Pyrocephalus rubinus (A)

Vireos, shrike-babblers, and erpornis
Order: PasseriformesFamily: Vireonidae

The vireos are a group of small to medium-sized passerine birds. They are typically greenish in color and resemble wood warblers apart from their heavier bills. Nine species have been recorded in Wyoming.

White-eyed vireo, Vireo griseus (A)
Bell's vireo, Vireo bellii (A)
Gray vireo, Vireo vicinior
Yellow-throated vireo, Vireo flavifrons (A)
Cassin's vireo, Vireo cassinii
Blue-headed vireo, Vireo solitarius
Plumbeous vireo, Vireo plumbeous
Philadelphia vireo, Vireo philadelphicus
Warbling vireo, Vireo gilvus
Red-eyed vireo, Vireo olivaceus

Shrikes

Order: PasseriformesFamily: Laniidae

Shrikes are passerine birds known for their habit of catching other birds and small animals and impaling the uneaten portions of their bodies on thorns.  A shrike's beak is hooked, like that of a typical bird of prey. Two species have been recorded in Wyoming.

Loggerhead shrike, Lanius ludovicianus
Northern shrike, Lanius borealis

Crows, jays, and magpies

Order: PasseriformesFamily: Corvidae

The family Corvidae includes crows, ravens, jays, choughs, magpies, treepies, nutcrackers, and ground jays. Corvids are above average in size among the Passeriformes, and some of the larger species show high levels of intelligence. Nine species have been recorded in Wyoming.

Canada jay, Perisoreus canadensis
Pinyon jay, Gymnorhinus cyanocephalus
Steller's jay, Cyanocitta stelleri
Blue jay, Cyanocitta cristata
Woodhouse's scrub-jay, Aphelocoma woodhouseii
Clark's nutcracker, Nucifraga columbiana
Black-billed magpie, Pica hudsonia
American crow, Corvus brachyrhynchos
Common raven, Corvus corax

Tits, chickadees, and titmice
Order: PasseriformesFamily: Paridae

The Paridae are mainly small stocky woodland species with short stout bills. Some have crests. They are adaptable birds, with a mixed diet including seeds and insects. Three species have been recorded in Wyoming.

Black-capped chickadee, Poecile atricapilla
Mountain chickadee, Poecile gambeli
Juniper titmouse, Baeolophus ridgwayi

Larks
Order: PasseriformesFamily: Alaudidae

Larks are small terrestrial birds with often extravagant songs and display flights. Most larks are fairly dull in appearance. Their food is insects and seeds. One species has been recorded in Wyoming.

Horned lark, Eremophila alpestris

Swallows

Order: PasseriformesFamily: Hirundinidae

The family Hirundinidae is adapted to aerial feeding. They have a slender streamlined body, long pointed wings, and a short bill with a wide gape. The feet are adapted to perching rather than walking, and the front toes are partially joined at the base. Seven species have been recorded in Wyoming.

Bank swallow, Riparia riparia
Tree swallow, Tachycineta bicolor
Violet-green swallow, Tachycineta thalassina
Northern rough-winged swallow, Stelgidopteryx serripennis
Purple martin, Progne subis
Barn swallow, Hirundo rustica
Cliff swallow, Petrochelidon pyrrhonota

Long-tailed tits
Order: PasseriformesFamily: Aegithalidae

Long-tailed tits are a group of small passerine birds with medium to long tails. They make woven bag nests in trees. Most eat a mixed diet which includes insects. One species has been recorded in Wyoming.

Bushtit, Psaltriparus minimus

Kinglets

Order: PasseriformesFamily: Regulidae

The kinglets are a small family of birds which resemble the titmice. They are very small insectivorous birds. The adults have colored crowns, giving rise to their names. Two species have been recorded in Wyoming.

Ruby-crowned kinglet, Corthylio calendula
Golden-crowned kinglet, Regulus satrapa

Waxwings
Order: PasseriformesFamily: Bombycillidae

The waxwings are a group of passerine birds with soft silky plumage and unique red tips to some of the wing feathers. In the Bohemian and cedar waxwings, these tips look like sealing wax and give the group its name. These are arboreal birds of northern forests. They live on insects in summer and berries in winter. Two species have been recorded in Wyoming.

Bohemian waxwing, Bombycilla garrulus
Cedar waxwing, Bombycilla cedrorum

Nuthatches

Order: PasseriformesFamily: Sittidae

Nuthatches are small woodland birds. They have the unusual ability to climb down trees head first, unlike other birds which can only go upwards. Nuthatches have big heads, short tails, and powerful bills and feet. Three species have been recorded in Wyoming.

Red-breasted nuthatch, Sitta canadensis
White-breasted nuthatch, Sitta carolinensis
Pygmy nuthatch, Sitta pygmaea

Treecreepers
Order: PasseriformesFamily: Certhiidae

Treecreepers are small woodland birds, brown above and white below. They have thin pointed down-curved bills, which they use to extricate insects from bark. They have stiff tail feathers, like woodpeckers, which they use to support themselves on vertical trees. One species has been recorded in Wyoming.

Brown creeper, Certhia americana

Gnatcatchers
Order: PasseriformesFamily: Polioptilidae

These dainty birds resemble Old World warblers in their structure and habits, moving restlessly through the foliage seeking insects. The gnatcatchers are mainly soft bluish gray in color and have the typical insectivore's long sharp bill. Many species have distinctive black head patterns (especially males) and long, regularly cocked, black-and-white tails. One species has been recorded in Wyoming.

Blue-gray gnatcatcher, Polioptila caerulea

Wrens
Order: PasseriformesFamily: Troglodytidae

Wrens are small and inconspicuous birds, except for their loud songs. They have short wings and thin down-turned bills. Several species often hold their tails upright. All are insectivorous. Nine species have been recorded in Wyoming.

Rock wren, Salpinctes obsoletus
Canyon wren, Catherpes mexicanus
House wren, Troglodytes aedon
Pacific wren, Troglodytes pacificus
Winter wren, Troglodytes hiemalis
Sedge wren, Cistothorus platensis (A)
Marsh wren, Cistothorus palustris
Carolina wren, Thryothorus ludovicianus (A)
Bewick's wren, Thryomanes bewickii

Mockingbirds and thrashers

Order: PasseriformesFamily: Mimidae

The mimids are a family of passerine birds which includes thrashers, mockingbirds, tremblers, and the New World catbirds. These birds are notable for their vocalization, especially their remarkable ability to mimic a wide variety of birds and other sounds heard outdoors. The species tend towards dull grays and browns in their appearance. Five species have been recorded in Wyoming.

Gray catbird, Dumetella carolinensis
Curve-billed thrasher, Toxostoma curvirostre (A)
Brown thrasher, Toxostoma rufum
Sage thrasher, Oreoscoptes montanus
Northern mockingbird, Mimus polyglottos

Starlings
Order: PasseriformesFamily: Sturnidae

Starlings are small to medium-sized passerine birds. They are medium-sized passerines with strong feet. Their flight is strong and direct and they are very gregarious. Their preferred habitat is fairly open country, and they eat insects and fruit. Plumage is typically dark with a metallic sheen. One species has been recorded in Wyoming.

European starling, Sturnus vulgaris (I)

Dippers
Order: PasseriformesFamily: Cinclidae

Dippers are small, stout, birds that feed in cold, fast moving streams. One species has been recorded in Wyoming.

American dipper, Cinclus mexicanus

Thrushes and allies

Order: PasseriformesFamily: Turdidae

The thrushes are a group of passerine birds that occur mainly but not exclusively in the Old World. They are plump, soft plumaged, small to medium-sized insectivores or sometimes omnivores, often feeding on the ground. Many have attractive songs. Eleven species have been recorded in Wyoming.

Eastern bluebird, Sialia sialis
Western bluebird, Sialia mexicana
Mountain bluebird, Sialia currucoides
Townsend's solitaire, Myadestes townsendi
Veery, Catharus fuscescens
Gray-cheeked thrush, Catharus minimus
Swainson's thrush, Catharus ustulatus
Hermit thrush, Catharus guttatus
Wood thrush, Hylocichla mustelina
American robin, Turdus migratorius
Varied thrush, Ixoreus naevius

Old World flycatchers
Order: PasseriformesFamily: Muscicapidae

The Old World flycatchers are a large family of small passerine birds mostly restricted to the Old World. These are mainly small arboreal insectivores, many of which, as the name implies, take their prey on the wing. One species has been recorded in Wyoming.

Red-flanked bluetail, Tarsiger cyanurus (A)

Old World sparrows

Order: PasseriformesFamily: Passeridae

Old World sparrows are small passerine birds. In general, sparrows tend to be small plump brownish or grayish birds with short tails and short powerful beaks. Sparrows are seed eaters, but they also consume small insects. One species has been recorded in Wyoming.

House sparrow, Passer domesticus (I)

Wagtails and pipits
Order: PasseriformesFamily: Motacillidae

Motacillidae is a family of small passerine birds with medium to long tails. They include the wagtails, longclaws, and pipits. They are slender ground-feeding insectivores of open country. Two species have been recorded in Wyoming.

American pipit, Anthus rubescens
Sprague's pipit, Anthus spragueii

Finches, euphonias, and allies
Order: PasseriformesFamily: Fringillidae

Finches are seed-eating passerine birds, that are small to moderately large and have a strong beak, usually conical and in some species very large. All have twelve tail feathers and nine primaries. These birds have a bouncing flight with alternating bouts of flapping and gliding on closed wings, and most sing well. Seventeen species have been recorded in Wyoming.

Brambling, Fringilla montifringilla (A)
Evening grosbeak, Coccothraustes vespertinus
Pine grosbeak, Pinicola enucleator
Gray-crowned rosy-finch, Leucosticte tephrocotis
Black rosy-finch, Leucosticte atrata
Brown-capped rosy-finch, Leucosticte australis
House finch, Haemorhous mexicanus
Purple finch, Haemorhous purpureus
Cassin's finch, Haemorhous cassinii
Common redpoll, Acanthis flammea
Hoary redpoll, Acanthis hornemanni (A)
Red crossbill, Loxia curvirostra
White-winged crossbill, Loxia leucoptera
Pine siskin, Spinus pinus
Lesser goldfinch, Spinus psaltria
Lawrence's goldfinch, Spinus lawrencei (A)
American goldfinch, Spinus tristis

Longspurs and snow buntings
Order: PasseriformesFamily: Calcariidae

The Calcariidae are a group of passerine birds that were traditionally grouped with the New World sparrows, but differ in a number of respects and are usually found in open grassy areas. Five species have been recorded in Wyoming.

Lapland longspur, Calcarius lapponicus
Chestnut-collared longspur, Calcarius ornatus
Smith's longspur, Calcarius pictus (A)
Thick-billed longspur, Rhyncophanes mccownii
Snow bunting, Plectrophenax nivalis

New World sparrows

Order: PasseriformesFamily: Passerellidae

Until 2017, these species were considered part of the family Emberizidae. Most of the species are known as sparrows, but these birds are not closely related to the Old World sparrows which are in the family Passeridae. Many of these have distinctive head patterns. Twenty-nine species have been recorded in Wyoming.

Cassin's sparrow, Peucaea cassinii (A)
Grasshopper sparrow, Ammodramus savannarum
Black-throated sparrow, Amphispiza bilineata
Lark sparrow, Chondestes grammacus
Lark bunting, Calamospiza melanocorys
Chipping sparrow, Spizella passerina
Clay-colored sparrow, Spizella pallida
Field sparrow, Spizella pusilla
Brewer's sparrow, Spizella breweri
Fox sparrow, Passerella iliaca
American tree sparrow, Spizelloides arborea
Dark-eyed junco, Junco hyemalis
White-crowned sparrow, Zonotrichia leucophrys
Golden-crowned sparrow, Zonotrichia atricapilla
Harris's sparrow, Zonotrichia querula
White-throated sparrow, Zonotrichia albicollis
Sagebrush sparrow, Artemisiospiza nevadensis
Vesper sparrow, Pooecetes gramineus
LeConte's sparrow, Ammospiza leconteii
Nelson's sparrow, Ammospiza nelsoni (A)
Baird's sparrow, Centronyx bairdii
Savannah sparrow, Passerculus sandwichensis
Song sparrow, Melospiza melodia
Lincoln's sparrow, Melospiza lincolnii
Swamp sparrow, Melospiza georgiana
Canyon towhee, Melozone fusca (A)
Green-tailed towhee, Pipilo chlorurus
Spotted towhee, Pipilo maculatus
Eastern towhee, Pipilo erythrophthalmus (A)

Yellow-breasted chat
Order: PasseriformesFamily: Icteriidae

This species was historically placed in the wood-warblers (Parulidae) but nonetheless most authorities were unsure if it belonged there. It was placed in its own family in 2017.

Yellow-breasted chat, Icteria virens

Troupials and allies
Order: PasseriformesFamily: Icteridae

The icterids are a group of small to medium-sized, often colorful passerine birds restricted to the New World and include the grackles, New World blackbirds, and New World orioles. Most species have black as a predominant plumage color, often enlivened by yellow, orange, or red. Thirteen species have been recorded in Wyoming.

Yellow-headed blackbird, Xanthocephalus xanthocephalus
Bobolink, Dolichonyx oryzivorus
Eastern meadowlark, Sturnella magna (A)
Western meadowlark, Sturnella neglecta
Orchard oriole, Icterus spurius
Bullock's oriole, Icterus bullockii
Baltimore oriole, Icterus galbula
Scott's oriole, Icterus parisorum
Red-winged blackbird, Agelaius phoeniceus
Brown-headed cowbird, Molothrus ater
Rusty blackbird, Euphagus carolinus
Brewer's blackbird, Euphagus cyanocephalus
Common grackle, Quiscalus quiscula
Great-tailed grackle, Quiscalus mexicanus (A)

New World warblers

Order: PasseriformesFamily: Parulidae

The wood-warblers are a group of small often colorful passerine birds restricted to the New World. Most are arboreal, but some like the ovenbird and the two waterthrushes, are more terrestrial. Most members of this family are insectivores. Thirty-nine species have been recorded in Wyoming.

Ovenbird, Seiurus aurocapilla
Worm-eating warbler, Helmitheros vermivorum
Northern waterthrush, Parkesia noveboracensis
Golden-winged warbler, Vermivora chrysoptera (A)
Blue-winged warbler, Vermivora cyanoptera (A)
Black-and-white warbler, Mniotilta varia
Prothonotary warbler, Protonotaria citrea (A)
Tennessee warbler, Leiothlypis peregrina
Orange-crowned warbler, Leiothlypis celata
Nashville warbler, Leiothlypis ruficapilla
Virginia's warbler, Leiothlypis virginiae
Connecticut warbler, Oporornis agilis (A)
MacGillivray's warbler, Geothlypis tolmiei
Mourning warbler, Geothlypis philadelphia (A)
Kentucky warbler, Geothlypis formosa (A)
Common yellowthroat, Geothlypis trichas
Hooded warbler, Setophaga citrina (A)
American redstart, Setophaga ruticilla
Cape May warbler, Setophaga tigrina (A)
Northern parula, Setophaga americana
Magnolia warbler, Setophaga magnolia
Bay-breasted warbler, Setophaga castanea
Blackburnian warbler, Setophaga fusca
Yellow warbler, Setophaga petechia
Chestnut-sided warbler, Setophaga pensylvanica
Blackpoll warbler, Setophaga striata
Black-throated blue warbler, Setophaga caerulescens
Palm warbler, Setophaga palmarum
Pine warbler, Setophaga pinus (A)
Yellow-rumped warbler, Setophaga coronata
Yellow-throated warbler, Setophaga dominica (A)
Prairie warbler, Setophaga discolor (A)
Black-throated gray warbler, Setophaga nigrescens
Townsend's warbler, Setophaga townsendi
Hermit warbler, Setophaga occidentalis
Black-throated green warbler, Setophaga virens (A)
Canada warbler, Cardellina canadensis (A)
Wilson's warbler, Cardellina pusilla
Red-faced warbler, Cardellina rubrifrons (A)

Cardinals and allies
Order: PasseriformesFamily: Cardinalidae

The cardinals are a family of robust, seed-eating birds with strong bills. They are typically associated with open woodland. The sexes usually have distinct plumages. Thirteen species have been recorded in Wyoming.

Hepatic tanager, Piranga flava (A)
Summer tanager, Piranga rubra
Scarlet tanager, Piranga olivacea (A)
Western tanager, Piranga ludoviciana
Northern cardinal, Cardinalis cardinalis
Yellow grosbeak, Pheucticus chrysopeplus (A)
Rose-breasted grosbeak, Pheucticus ludovicianus
Black-headed grosbeak, Pheucticus melanocephalus
Blue grosbeak, Passerina caerulea
Lazuli bunting, Passerina amoena
Indigo bunting, Passerina cyanea
Painted bunting, Passerina ciris (A)
Dickcissel, Spiza americana

See also
List of birds of Yellowstone National Park
List of birds of Grand Teton National Park
List of birds
Lists of birds by region
List of birds of North America

Notes

References

External links
Wyoming Audubon Society..

Lists of birds of the United States
Birds